Bekopaka is a rural municipality in western Madagascar. It belongs to the district of Antsalova, which is a part of Melaky Region. The population of the commune was estimated to be approximately 9,000 in 2001 commune census.

Bekopaka is served by a local airport, and primary and junior level secondary education are available in town. The most important crop is rice, while other important products are bananas, maize and cassava.

Rivers
Bekopaka is situated on the Manambolo River.

References

Populated places in Melaky